Mitică Popescu (2 December 1936 – 3 January 2023) was a Romanian actor.

Biography
Popescu was born in Bucharest on 2 December 1936. He started his studies in the mid-1950s at the Institute of Theatrical and Cinematographic Art, but he was arrested by the Securitate in 1958, allegedly for planning to flee the country, and was sentenced to 3 years of prison. First detained at Malmaison Prison in Bucharest, he was transferred to Jilava Prison, and then to the labor camps at Periprava and Salcia on the Danube.

In 2002 he was awarded the National Order of Faithful Service, knight rank.

In 1977, Popescu married the actress Leopoldina Bălănuță, who died in 1998. He was buried with military honors in the city's Bellu Cemetery, next to his wife.

Activity

Theatre
 Philadelphia Here I Come! by Brian Friel (1973)
 Matca by Marin Sorescu (1974) – Logodnicul, Momâie
 Răspântia cea mare by Victor Ion Popa (1974) – Andrei
 Life of Galileo by Bertolt Brecht (1975) – Sagredo
 Mânia posturilor by Vasile Alecsandri (1975) – Serviescu
 The Andersonville Trial by Saul Levitt (1976) – Doctor John C. Bates 
 The Wild Duck by Henrik Ibsen (1976) – Hjalmar Ekdal
 Cititorul by contor by Paul Everac (1976)
 The Cave Dwellers by William Saroyan (1976) – The duke 
 Două ore de pace by Dumitru Radu Popescu (1977) – Stelică
 Omul, continuați să puneți întrebări by Ada D'Albon (1977)
 The Émigrés by Slawomir Mrozek (1977)
 The Madwoman of Chaillot by Jean Giraudoux (1978) – The garbageman 
 Să îmbrăcăm pe cei goi by Luigi Pirandello (1978) – Lodovico Nota
 Absurd Person Singular by Alan Ayckbourn (1979) – Sidney Hopcroft
 Nu sunt Turnul Eiffel by Ecaterina Oproiu (1979) – Old man
 O șansă pentru fiecare by Radu F. Alexandru (1979) – The functionary
 Evul mediu întâmplător by Romulus Guga (1980) – Ioachim
 The Master and Margarita by Mihail Bulgakov (1980) – Koroviev
 Niște țărani by Dinu Săraru (1981) – Năiță Lucean
 Ca frunza dudului din rai by Dumitru Radu Popescu (1982) – Ticlete
 Ivona, Princess of Burgundia by Witold Gombrowicz (1983) – King Ignat
 Mitică Popescu by Camil Petrescu  (1984)
 O femeie drăguță cu o floare și ferestre spre nord by Edvard Radzinsky  (1986) – Fedea
 Actorii (1990)
 The Mandrake by Niccolò Machiavelli (1991) – Messer Niccia
 Les Monstres sacrés by Jean Cocteau (1991) – Florent 
 Jacques and his Master by Milan Kundera (1992) – Jacques 
 The Seagull by Anton Chekhov (1993) – Piotr Nikolaevici Sorin
 As You Like It by William Shakespeare (1996) – Amiens
 She Stoops to Conquer by Oliver Goldsmith (1997) – Mr. Hardcastle 
 Barefoot in the Park by Neil Simon (1997) – Victor Velasco
 The Ghost Sonata by August Strindberg (1999) – The old man
 The School for Wives by Molière (1999) – Chrysalby 
 The Servant of Two Masters' by Carlo Goldoni (1999) – Pantalone
 Cimitirul păsărilor by Antonio Gala (2000) – Deogracias
 Alex and Morris by Michael Elkin (2000) – Morris

Filmography
 Umilință (2011) - Sandu
 Ticăloșii (2007)
 Păcală se întoarce (2006) – a peasant
 Sistemul nervos (2005)
 Lotus (2004) – Manasia
 Dulcea saună a morții (2003) – Mutul
 Turnul din Pisa (2002) – Colonel
 The Earth's Most Beloved Son (1993) – Securitate officer
  (1993)
 Rămânerea (1992)
 Miss Litoral (1990)
 Idolul și Ion-Anapoda(1988) –
 Drumeț în calea lupilor (1988) – poștașul
 Un studio în căutarea unei vedete (1988)
 The Moromete Family (1987) – Cocoșilă
 Trenul by aur (1987) – Comisar Munteanu
 Căsătorie cu repetiție (1985) – Mitică
 Fapt divers (1984)
 Emisia continuă (1984)
 Fram (Serial TV) (1983)
 Mitul lui Mitică (1982) – himself
 Un Saltimbanc la Polul Nord (1982)
 Saltimbancii (1981)
 Vânătoarea by vulpi (1980) – Năiță Lucean
 The Moment (1979)
  (1979)
  (1978)
  (1978)
  (1978)
  (1977)
  (1977)
  (1976)
  (1976) – Marin
 Red Apples (1976) – prosecutor
  (1975)
  (1974) – Manea
  (1974) – Peter
  (1974) – Romniceanu

References

External links 
 

1936 births
2023 deaths
Male actors from Bucharest
Members of the Romanian Orthodox Church
Caragiale National University of Theatre and Film alumni
People detained by the Securitate
Romanian male film actors
Romanian male television actors
Romanian male stage actors
20th-century Romanian male actors
21st-century Romanian male actors
Burials at Bellu Cemetery